Senator Small may refer to:

Arthur A. Small (1933–2015), Iowa State Senate
Jason Small (politician), Montana State Senate
Len Small (1862–1936), Illinois State Senate
Mary Small (politician) (born 1954), Maine State Senate
William B. Small (politician) (1817–1878), New Hampshire State Senate

See also
Robert Smalls (1839–1915), South Carolina State Senate